Coly-Saint-Amand is a commune in the Dordogne department in Nouvelle-Aquitaine in southwestern France. It was established on 1 January 2019 by merger of the former communes of Saint-Amand-de-Coly (the seat) and Coly.

See also
Communes of the Dordogne department

References

Communes of Dordogne